The Museum of Foreign Debt was opened on April 28, 2005, in Buenos Aires, Argentina. The museum highlights the dangers of borrowing money from abroad. There are no English translations in the museum, everything is in the Spanish language. The Argentine economic crisis that drove the 2001 riots in Argentina prompted the largest foreign debt default in history – approximately $100 billion USD.

The museum is located at the Faculty of Economic Sciences of the University of Buenos Aires, and shows the debt's history, how it grew, and the responsible parties for each action since the first attempt of independence in 1810. The museum has no entrance fee.

See also

Economy of Argentina

External links
Clarin newspaper (Spanish)
BBC (Spanish)

Museums of economics
Museum of Foreign Debt
Foreign Debt
Museums established in 2005
History museums in Argentina
Museum of Foreign Debt
University of Buenos Aires
2005 establishments in Argentina